Koyama or Kōyama may refer to:

Places 
 Koyama (island), an island part of the Bajuni Islands archipelago in the Indian Ocean
 Kōyama, Kagoshima, a town located in Kimotsuki District, Kagoshima, Japan merged in 2005 with the town of Uchinoura
 Koyama Station, a train station in Tottori, Tottori Prefecture, Japan

People 

, Japanese actress
 Andy Koyama (born 1962), Canadian sound engineer
 Chire Koyama (born 1964), Chinese-Japanese former table tennis world champion
, member of Hinoi Team, a former Japanese female pop group
, Japanese botanist
, Japanese Astronomer
, Japanese musician
, Japanese football player
, Japanese voice actress
, Japanese composer for orchestras, vocal and traditional Japanese instrumentation
, Japanese Protestant Christian theologian
, Japanese veteran voice actress and J-pop vocalist
, Japanese baseball player
, Japanese racing driver
, Japanese voice actress
, Japanese ice hockey player
, Japanese actor and voice actor
, Japanese film director
, Japanese baseball player
, Japanese former middle-distance runner
, Japanese screenwriter and novelist
, Japanese football player
, Japanese pair skater
, Japanese motorcycle road racer
, Japanese volleyball player
, Japanese Go player
, Japanese manga artist
, Japanese baseball player

Other 
 3383 Koyama, a main-belt asteroid discovered in 1951
 Koyama's spruce (Picea koyamae), a tree species found in Japan
 Koyama Press, a Canadian publisher

See also 
 Oyama (disambiguation)
 List of most common surnames in Asia

Japanese-language surnames